WWE has maintained several professional wrestling world championships since Capitol Wrestling Corporation seceded from the National Wrestling Alliance in 1963 to become the World Wide Wrestling Federation (WWWF), which was later subjected to various name changes, including World Wrestling Federation (WWF) and World Wrestling Entertainment (WWE)—in April 2011, the company ceased using its full name and has since just been referred to as WWE. Whenever the WWE brand extension has been implemented, separate world championships have been created or allocated for each brand.

Overview

History 

In the 1950s, Capitol Wrestling Corporation (CWC) was a member of the National Wrestling Alliance (NWA) and by 1963, its executives held a controlling stake over NWA operations. During this time, Buddy Rogers held the NWA World Heavyweight Championship until January 24, when Lou Thesz defeated Rogers for the championship in a one fall match. Claiming the championship can only be contested in a traditional two out of three falls match, the promotion disputed the change, and thus seceded from the NWA and became the World Wide Wrestling Federation (WWWF). The WWWF World Heavyweight Championship was then established and awarded to Buddy Rogers with the explanation that he won a fictional tournament in Rio de Janeiro, supposedly defeating Antonino Rocca in the finals. After several years, the WWWF became affiliated with the NWA once again, and "World" was dropped from the championship's name. In 1979, the WWWF was renamed World Wrestling Federation (WWF), and then after conclusively ending its affiliation with the NWA in 1983, the championship became known as the WWF World Heavyweight Championship. Although the full name appeared on the belt until 1998, the name was often abbreviated to WWF Championship, which became its official name in 1998.

In 1991, World Championship Wrestling (WCW), a member of the NWA, established the WCW World Heavyweight Championship to replace the NWA's world championship. That same year, reigning and inaugural WCW Champion Ric Flair left WCW with the Big Gold Belt, which had represented the championship, and joined the WWF. Flair then began appearing on WWF television with the Big Gold Belt, calling himself "The Real World Champion"; however, this was never officially recognized as a world championship in WWF. In 1993, WCW seceded from the NWA and grew to become a rival promotion to the WWF. Both organizations grew into mainstream prominence and were eventually involved in a television ratings war, dubbed the Monday Night Wars. Near the end of the ratings war, WCW began a financial decline, which culminated in WWF purchasing WCW in March 2001. As a result of the purchase, the WWF acquired, among other assets, WCW's championships. Thus, there were two world championships in the WWF: the original WWF Championship and the WCW Championship, which was eventually renamed the "World Championship".

In December 2001, the two championships were unified at Vengeance. At the event, Stone Cold Steve Austin defeated Kurt Angle to retain the WWF Championship, while Chris Jericho defeated The Rock for the World Championship. After this, Jericho then defeated Austin, unifying the WWF and World Championships, and becoming the first Undisputed WWF Champion; the Undisputed championship retained the lineage of the WWF Championship and the World Championship was retired. The Undisputed Championship continued up through the beginning of the first brand extension, which saw wrestlers being drafted to the company's main television programs, Raw and SmackDown, each show representing the brand of the same name, with championships assigned to and authority figures appointed for each brand. The holder of the Undisputed Championship was the only male wrestler allowed to appear on both shows.

In May 2002, the WWF was renamed World Wrestling Entertainment (WWE) and the championships were renamed accordingly. At first, the Undisputed Championship remained unaffiliated with either brand as wrestlers from both brands could challenge the champion. Following the appointment of Eric Bischoff and Stephanie McMahon as General Managers of Raw and SmackDown, respectively, Stephanie McMahon convinced then-Undisputed Champion Brock Lesnar to become exclusive to the SmackDown brand, leaving the Raw brand without a world championship. In response, on September 2, Bischoff disputed Lesnar's status as champion, stating Lesnar was refusing to defend against the designated No. 1 contender, Triple H, and awarded the latter with the newly created World Heavyweight Championship. Immediately afterwards, Lesnar's championship dropped the epithet "Undisputed" and became known as the WWE Championship.

In 1994, Eastern Championship Wrestling seceded from the NWA and became Extreme Championship Wrestling (ECW) and established the ECW World Heavyweight Championship. In 2001, the ECW promotion folded due to bankruptcy and WWE bought the assets of ECW in 2003. In June 2006, WWE established a third brand dubbed ECW on which stars from the former promotion and newer talent competed. When ECW's Rob Van Dam won the WWE Championship at ECW One Night Stand, the ECW Championship was subsequently reactivated as the world championship of the ECW brand (and the third concurrently active world championship in WWE) and was awarded to Van Dam, who held both until he lost the WWE Championship to Raw's Edge the following month. The three world championships at one point or another switched brands over the course of the brand extension, usually as a result of the annual draft. The ECW brand was disbanded in 2010, subsequently deactivating the ECW Championship. The first brand extension ended in August 2011; earlier that year in April, the promotion ceased using its full name with "WWE" becoming an orphaned initialism.

On July 1, 2012 WWE Introduced the NXT Championship is a professional wrestling championship created and promoted by the American professional wrestling promotion WWE. It is defended as the top championship of the NXT brand division, the promotion's developmental territory. On July 26, 2012 Seth Rollins became the inaugural champion.

Following the end of the first brand extension, both the WWE Champion and World Heavyweight Champion could appear on both Raw and SmackDown. In November 2013, the night after Survivor Series, then-World Heavyweight Champion John Cena made a challenge to then-WWE Champion Randy Orton to determine an undisputed WWE world champion. Orton defeated Cena in a Tables, Ladders, and Chairs match at the TLC: Tables, Ladders & Chairs pay-per-view on December 15, 2013, to unify the championship. Subsequently, the unified championship was renamed WWE World Heavyweight Championship and retained the lineage of the WWE Championship; the World Heavyweight Championship was retired.

After Dean Ambrose became champion in June 2016, the title's name reverted to "WWE Championship". In light of the return of the WWE brand extension the following month, Ambrose was drafted to SmackDown and retained his title at Battleground on July 24 against Raw draftees Seth Rollins and Roman Reigns, making it exclusive to SmackDown. On the July 25 episode of Raw, to address the lack of a world championship for the brand, the WWE Universal Championship was created; Finn Bálor became the inaugural champion at SummerSlam. After the unveiling of the Universal Championship, the WWE Championship was renamed WWE World Championship, but reverted to WWE Championship in December 2016 during AJ Styles' first reign.

Superlative reigns 
 A "+" indicates that the title reign is ongoing.

Ten longest 
The following list shows the ten longest world championship reigns in WWE history.

Longest per championship 
The following list shows the longest reigning champion for each world championship created and/or promoted by WWE.

Most per championship 
The following list shows the wrestlers with the most reigns for each world championship created and/or promoted by WWE.

Most total reigns 
The following list shows the wrestlers who have the most world championship reigns in total, combining all titles they have held as recognized by WWE. This list also shows the titles that they won to achieve this record (minimum five world championship reigns).

Inaugural WWE World Heavyweight Championship holders 
The following list shows the inaugural WWE World Heavyweight Championship belt holders and the years that they were first ever won in WWE history.

See also 

 Tag team championships in WWE
 Women's championships in WWE

References 

World heavyweight wrestling championships
WWE championships